Frank W. Cox High School is a secondary school located in the Great Neck subdivision of Virginia Beach, Virginia. It was founded in 1961 as the Northeast Junior High School, but upon opening, it was named after a former superintendent of Virginia Beach City Public Schools, Frank Woodard Cox, who led the school division from 1933 to 1968. A replacement building, also designated as a primary hurricane shelter, was built nearby, at 2425 Shorehaven Drive. The high school was moved into the new building in the fall of 1983. The original building at 1848 N. Great Neck Road became Great Neck Junior High and then Great Neck Middle School. The original building was demolished in 2012.

Academic and athletic honors
Frank W. Cox has an 80% annual passing rate on Advanced Placement Tests, with two out of three graduating students passing with an advanced diploma. The school has been recognized by major organizations such as Newsweek, which named the high school as a "top" public high school. Cox has an array of sports teams. Its field hockey program has won a record 23 state titles. The music program, student newspaper, and student yearbook won Blue ribbon awards in 2018.

The school has won fifty six state athletic titles. It has been awarded the Virginia High School League Wachovia Cup for outstanding academic and athletic achievement eight out of 17 times, more than any other school.

Cox High School's WorldQuest team has won the regional WorldQuest competition (a competition in geopolitical knowledge, current events, and geography) more than any other school in Hampton Roads, most recently the 2011 WorldQuest competition hosted by the World Affairs Council of Greater Hampton Roads. The school no longer hosts WorldQuest, however.

Cox is one of five Virginia Beach high schools ranked in the top 2600 in Newsweek's 2006 ranking of American high schools.

Music honors
The Cox Marching Falcons competed in the 2011 USSBA (now known as U.S. Bands) Group II open national championships, and placed 1st overall with a score of 95.738, with captions in visual performance, overall effect, and colorguard.  The band is also a current six-time state championship program, winning the 2010 USSBA group I open Virginia state championships, the 2011 USSBA group II open Virginia state championships, the 2012 USBANDS group III open Virginia state championships, and the 2015 USBANDS Group III State Championships. The Cox Marching Falcons now compete in the VMBC Circuit.

Notable alumni
Felicia Barton - American Idol finalist
Vernon Berg, III - US Navy officer, artist.
Jason Dubois - baseball player
Chandler Fenner Super Bowl Champion, played football in the NFL, CFL, and the College of the Holy Cross
Michael Hearst - composer, musician, author
Genesis the Greykid aka Russ - poet, artist, creative
Bubba Jenkins - NCAA Champion wrestler; current professional MMA fighter
Zachary Knighton - actor
Jared MacEachern - Machine Head bassist/backing vocals
Stefanie Fee - US Field Hockey Olympic Team player (Olympics 2012 and 2016)
Ryan McGinness - artist
Chris Taylor - baseball player
Brinson Paolini - professional golfer
Ross Burbank - NFL Football Player
Todd Schnitt - longtime nationally syndicated radio personality
Eric Bird - soccer player

See also
AAA Eastern Region
AAA Beach District

Footnotes

External links
 Virginia Beach City Public Schools
 FWCHS Home Website
 Fran Cox Football @ VHSL-Reference

Educational institutions established in 1961
Magnet schools in Virginia
High schools in Virginia Beach, Virginia
Public high schools in Virginia
1961 establishments in Virginia